Indang, officially the Municipality of Indang,  is a 1st class municipality in the province of Cavite, Philippines. According to the 2020 census, it has a population of 68,699 people.

Etymology
Indang (originally called Indan) was established as a town in 1655, when it was administratively separated from the nearby town of Silang, Cavite. Indang derived its name from the words "Inrang" or "yndan", a tree which was also called "Anubing". The tree of Inrang was used to be abundant in the local since the early times.

History

Before 1655: Separation and Independence
Indang was part of Silang, Cavite for about 70 years, the municipality of Indang was organized with a prominent native, Juan Dimabiling, as the first gobernadorcillo. The distance between the barrio of Indang and the Poblacion of Silang caused the residents of the former great difficulty in transacting officials' business and attending religious services. This led the people of Indang to petition higher authorities for the conversion of the barrio into a separate municipality. The exact month and day of the municipality's establishment have no verification. However, existing documents proved that Indang was instituted during the cold month of 1655. Therefore, the municipal government decided and declared December 1 as "Indang Day" which was annually celebrated thereafter by its people.

1896-1897: The Philippine Revolution
During the Philippine Revolution, Indan was known by its Katipunan name "Walang Tinag". It was also during this time that the letter "g" was added to its name; thus it is now called Indang. It belongs to the Magdiwang faction, which rivaled the Magdalo faction. In Barangay Limbon, Andrés Bonifacio was arrested after he left from Tejeros Convention and prevented from pursuing his counter-revolutionary plan according to witnesses. One of these witnesses was Severino de las Alas, a resident of the town, who accused Bonifacio of trying to threaten the people and burning the Church of Indang, dedicated to the town patron, Saint Gregory the Great, was built in the 17th century and is one of the oldest in the province. He later served in newly formed Revolutionary Government as Interior Secretary.

1906-1998: Cavite State University
The Cavite State University began here in 1906 as an intermediate school and was later transformed into a high school. Named after Severino De las Alas in 1958, it later become a college in 1962 and in 1998 earned university status.

2008-2015: Tagaytay Water Crisis 
In 2008, Previous Mayor Bienvenido Dimero issued a certification to PTK2 H2O authorising it "to utilise, use, or tap" four rivers in Indang. After the certification in 2008, the company began ground clearing operations and excavation in Barangay Kayquit II.

Meanwhile, the Save Waters of Indang Movement criticized the DENR Region IV-A for issuing an Environmental Compliance Certificate (ECC) without the required Environmental Impact Statement (EIS) that would assess the possible environmental hazards the project would cause.

PTK2 H2O also only secured the ECC after the water permits were issued.

"In other words, the ECC is incomplete and issued as an afterthought. Under the law, the ECC and the requisite EIS are conditioned prior to and not after the issuance of permits," reads the petition.

The ECC allows the company to build an intake structure, booster pumps, flocculation, and sedimentation basin, pressure filter tanks, effluent channels, booster pumping stations, water pipes, and administration buildings in Barangay Kayquit II.

The project also led to the cutting down of trees, which also allegedly lacked an ECC.

Geography
It is centrally located in the province of Cavite. It is bounded on the north by the municipality of Naic and the city of Trece Martires, on the south by the municipality of Mendez and the city of Tagaytay, on the west by the municipalities of Alfonso and Maragondon, and on the east by the municipality of Amadeo and the city of General Trias.

Topography
The topography of Indang is characterised by gently sloping or rolling terrain. Almost 40.36% of its total land area is within the slope grade of 3-8%, while 2,135 hectares is within the slope range of 8-15% which is characterised by undulating or sloping terrain.

Elevation
The land area is furthermore fairy well dissected by numerous creeks and streams that are deeply cut., characterised by steep and abrupt banks. Rivers, creeks and spring supply the water needed for both agricultural and households purposes. These rivers and creeks also serves as natural drainage into which storm water is discharged and flow in northern direction to discharged into either Manila Bay or Laguna de Bay.

Climate
Indang has a tropical climate (Köppen climate classification: Aw) with two pronounced seasons: wet season and dry season. Wet season covers the period from May to December of each year and dry season covers the period from January to April. Due to the rolling landscape of the town, the southern villages near the Mendez and Alfonso borders, due to high elevations and the nearness to Tagaytay, experience cooler temperatures as compared to those in the north, especially from November to February.

Barangays 
Indang is politically subdivided into 36 Barangays.

Demographics

Population

There are five (5) residential subdivisions within the municipality which occupies 44.75 hectares of land.

Languages
The municipality of Indang has a majority of English and Tagalog speakers. Almost all households in the town are bilingual and know how to speak English.

Religion
Christianity is the predominant faith, composed of Roman Catholics, Protestants, and other independent Christian groups. A considerable percentage of the population are also composed of Muslims. Religious tolerance exists among members of different sects.

Economy

Agriculture
The economy of Indang largely depends on agriculture. It is a first-class municipality. The 80.45% or 7,176.38 hectares are primarily devoted to agriculture. They are predominantly planted with various types of crops like coconut, banana, coffee, fruit trees, and pineapple, while there are small portions of rice, root crops, vegetables, and corn. Most farmers are engaged in multi-cropping farming system. The largest number of employment is farming and trading of agricultural products. Livestock and poultry raisers occupied an area of about 22.76 hectares or 0.32% of the total agricultural area.

Indang has a public market, located in Poblacion 4, where goods such as vegetables, seafood, meat, and household items are sold.
 
On the trade and industry, existing commercial and agribusiness establishments play a relatively major role in the predominantly agri-based economy of Indang.
 
Municipal record on this establishment shows the wholesale and retail trade stores are clustered within the poblacion or urban area while in the rural, the trading establishments are dominated by sari-sari stores.
 
Agro-business commercial farms raise large volumes of livestock and poultry. As per record of the municipal agricultural office, there are existing hog farms, broiler farms, layer and breeder farms. 
 
Indang Public Market and Slaughterhouse stand on 20,316 square metre government-owned property along J. Dimabiling St., Poblacion IV. This public market has three simple market buildings and "Bagsakan" for wholesale trading. The slaughterhouse occupies an area of 1,800 square metres, which is adjacent to meat section of market building. It has complete facilities like corral and hog-holding pen with drainage and sanitation facilities.

Infrastructure

Transportation 

Land transportation is the principal mode of transporting goods and services in Indang and its neighbouring municipalities and cities. Vehicular routes going to other municipalities are: 
 Indang-Mendez-Tagaytay via Indang–Mendez Rd., then Mendez–Tagaytay Rd.; 
 Indang-Alfonso via Indang–Alfonso Rd.;
 Indang-Naic via Naic–Indang Rd.;
 Indang-Trece Martires-Dasmariñas via Trece Martires–Indang Rd. passing to Governor's Drive; and
 Indang-Pasay (Baclaran) via Trece Martires–Indang Rd., Governor's Drive (Trece Martires) and Aguinaldo Highway (Dasmariñas).

There are several types of vehicles traversing the place, but the most commonly used vehicles for public conveyances are busses, jeepneys and a number of tricycles plying within the Poblacion area and nearby barangays.

Indang has 25.57 km barangay roads, 4.982 km municipal roads, 28.64 km provincial roads, 29.64 km national roads, and 46.433 km farm-to-market roads within the municipality. The barangay roads primarily provide the delivery of goods, services, and facilities which bring improvement on the living condition of the rural populace. On the other hand, the 93.10% of farm-to-market roads are not passable particularly during rainy seasons. The widening and improvement of these roads would ensure faster, easier, and safer transport of farm products. There are 30 bridges connecting the 36 barangays of this municipality, these are classified as national, provincial, and barangay bridges.

Utilities

Water 

The original waterworks system was constructed in 1922–1924 with Ikloy Spring as its source and covers only the Poblacion. The system consists of a spring chamber, pumphouse with hydro turbine prime over and centrifugal pump, ground reservoir, 2 km transmission pipelines and distribution facilities. In 1980, a separate distribution pipe and ground reservoir in Barangay Kaytambog was included in the system. Total registered concessionaires were 463 as of August 1980. Water production from the spring source is 580 cubic metre of which only 26.6 percent is accounted for. The total water demand for various design years is derived from the demands for domestic, commercial, institutional and public faucets demands including an allowance for leakage and wastage. The possible sources of water supply for Indang are springs, namely, Ikloy, Ipie I and Ipie II. All the springs emanate from fissures on the contact between permeable pyroclastics and impermeable tuff above the river course. The full production of Ikloy Spring alone is estimated to meet the water demand of Indang Water District.

Electricity 
The electric services are provided by Meralco, the sole electric power distributor in Indang and Greater Manila Area.

Telecommunication 
The Philippine Long Distance Telephone Company (PLDT) and Digital Telecommunications Philippines (Digitel) are the two leading telephone companies serving the municipality. The PLDT has its branch office at barangay Kaytapos, while the Digitel branch office is located at Tagaytay. Year 2010, Globe Telecom is now operating their telephone lines bundled with DSL to selected barangays of Indang including Poblacion, Kaytapos and Alulod.
 
Smart Communications, Globe Telecom and Dito Telecommunity installed their Mobile Base Transceiver Stations and Telecommunication Antenna Tower in the locality. Smart has currently five mobile base station towers, Globe has only eight mobile transceiver facility. Cellular phones are commonly used by the residents especially in remote barangay where telephone landline services are not available.

Newspapers, magazines, and other related reading materials reach the municipality. Likewise, radio and television sets have a good reception. All these forms of communication channels make the populace of Indang well-informed and up-to-date in terms of national and international issues.

Healthcare 
M. V. Santiago Medical & Diagnostic Centre is the only hospital in Indang, located in A. Luna St. Poblacion 3, Indang, Cavite and was founded on May 27, 2013.

Government

Elected officials

The following are the elected officials of the town elected last May 09, 2022 which serves until 2025:

Barangay officials

Education

Cavite State University 

The Cavite State University, (CvSU) (Filipino: Pamantasang Estado ng Cavite), is a university in the province of Cavite in the Philippines. Its 72-hectare (180-acre) main campus, known as the Don Severino de las Alas Campus, is located in the Municipality of Indang, Cavite about 60 km (37 mi) southwest of Manila. The educational institution has ten other campuses spread all over the province.

The school was established initially as an intermediate school by the Thomasites, a group of American teachers brought by the United States during the early part of the American colonial period to revamp the system of education in the country. By 1964, the school has grown into a college known as the Don Severino Agricultural College (DSAC). It became a university on January 22, 1998, and was renamed as the Cavite State University.

Private schools

 Holy Family School of Indang Inc. 
 Nazarene Christian School of Indang 
 Sebastien Montessori, Inc.
 Academia de San Vicente Ferrer 
 Hillcrest Periwinkle School, Inc. 
 Indang Christian Academy
 Liceo dela Concepcion of Indang 
 Lycee de San Antonio Montessori 
 Perpetual Cavite Institute 
 Royal Palm Academy of Cavite, Inc.
 Saint Gregory Academy 
 Daine Western Cavite Institute

Public elementary schools 

 Agus-os Elementary School
 Alulod Elementary School
 Banaba Cerca Elementary School
 Banaba Lejos Elementary School
 Bancod Elementary School
 Buna Cerca Elementary School
 Buna Lejos Elementary School
 Calumpang Lejos Elementary School
 Carasuchi Elementary School
 Daine Elementary School
 Dr. Alfredo Pio De Roda Elementary School
 Guyam Elementary School
 Guyam Munti Elementary School
 Indang Central Elementary School
 Indang East Elementary School
 Kayquit Elementary School
 Kaytambog Elementary School
 Kaytapos Elementary School
 Lumampong Balagbag Elementary School
 Lumampong Elementary School
 Mahabang Kahoy Cerca Elementary School
 Mahabang Kahoy Lejos Elementary School
 Mataas Na Lupa Elementary School
 Tambo Elementary School
 Tambo Munti-Kulit Elementary School

Public secondary schools 
 Cavite State University - Science High School
 Lumampong National High School
 Lumampong National High School - Indang Annex
 Lumampong National High School - Calumpang Annex

Notable people 
George Garcia, Chairperson of the Commission on Elections

Sister city 
 Gangneung, South Korea

See also 
 Cavite State University
 St. Gregory the Great Parish Church
 Kalamay Buna

References

External links

Municipality of Indang
[ Philippine Standard Geographic Code]
Philippine Census Information

Municipalities of Cavite